Ibo District is a small district of Cabo Delgado Province in northern Mozambique. Its principal town is Vila do Ibo on Ibo Island.

External links
Government profile 

Districts in Cabo Delgado Province